
This is a list of bridges documented by the Historic American Engineering Record in the U.S. state of New Hampshire.

Bridges

References

External links

List
List
New Hampshire
Bridges, HAER
Bridges, HAER